The Conservative government of the United Kingdom of Great Britain and Ireland that began in 1858 and ended in 1859 was led by Lord Derby in the House of Lords and Benjamin Disraeli in the House of Commons.

History
After the collapse of Lord Palmerston's first government, the Conservative leader Lord Derby again formed a minority government, with Benjamin Disraeli as Chancellor of the Exchequer. The government oversaw the establishment of Crown rule in India, but was still not strong enough to retain power, falling in June 1859. Lord Palmerston then returned, forming his second ministry.

Cabinet

February 1858 – June 1859

List of ministers
Cabinet members are listed in bold face.

Notes

References
 British Historical Facts 1830–1900, by Chris Cook and Brendon Keith (The Macmillan Press 1975) pp. 21–22 SBN 333 13220 3

British ministries
Government
1850s in the United Kingdom
1858 establishments in the United Kingdom
1859 disestablishments in the United Kingdom
Ministries of Queen Victoria
Cabinets established in 1858
Cabinets disestablished in 1859